David Seger (born 15 July 1999) is a Swedish football midfielder who plays for Örebro SK.

References

1999 births
Living people
Swedish footballers
Association football midfielders
BKV Norrtälje players
Sollentuna FK players
Örebro SK players
Ettan Fotboll players
Allsvenskan players
Superettan players